The men's time trial class C4 road cycling event at the 2020 Summer Paralympics took place on 31 August 2021 at Fuji Speedway, Japan. 9 riders from 8 nations competed in this event.

The C4 classification is for cyclists with mild hemiplegic or diplegic spasticity; mild athetosis or ataxia; unilateral below knee or bilateral below elbow amputation, etcetera.

Results
The event took place on 31 August 2021, at 14:07:

References

Men's road time trial C4